Brittany Webster (born 25 June 1987 in Toronto, Ontario) is a Canadian cross-country skier.

She competed at the 2010 Winter Olympics in Vancouver, and has been named to the Canadian team for the 2014 Winter Olympics in Sochi.

Webster attended Mayfield Secondary School.

Cross-country skiing results
All results are sourced from the International Ski Federation (FIS).

Olympic Games

World Championships

World Cup

Season standings

References

External links
 Brittany Webster at the 2010 Winter Olympics

1987 births
Living people
Skiers from Toronto
Canadian female cross-country skiers
Cross-country skiers at the 2014 Winter Olympics
Olympic cross-country skiers of Canada
Cross-country skiers at the 2010 Winter Olympics
21st-century Canadian women